The Canadian Meteorological Centre (CMC), located in Dorval, Quebec, is the branch of Environment Canada's Meteorological Service of Canada that is tasked with providing forecast guidance to national and regional prediction centres, and is responsible for running the Global Environmental Multiscale (GEM) model, often referred to as the CMC model, together with its regional and ensemble variants. It is made up of three branches: 

The Informatics Branch provides centralized computing and telecommunications services to meet the Atmospheric Environment Programs' objectives, support other departmental operations, and assist other approved users. It operates and maintains the supercomputer facility in Dorval and various telecommunications networks. 

The Operations Branch is responsible for the meteorological operations of numerous production systems for weather, climate, air quality, and environmental programs at the Canadian Meteorological Centre. In addition, the Branch provides highly specialized support to environmental emergencies. Its outputs contribute and satisfy national and international Meteorological Service of Canada's operational and related commitments. 

The Development Branch is responsible for the technology transfer from research to operations of the Canadian environmental prediction system. In addition, the Branch is responsible for developing and improving systems and products for the Meteorological Service of Canada and other important clients and partners, and to ensure the proper technology transfer of these into an operational environment. One of its main component is the Recherche en Prévision Numérique.

See also 
 André Robert father of Canadian numerical models
 Numerical weather prediction
 Atmospheric models

External links

 MSC Open Data documentation, which supersedes the CMC Product Guide
 Environment Canada Weather

Meteorological Service of Canada
Regional Specialized Meteorological Centres